Luca Bassani Antivari is the Italian founder and president of the Monaco-based maritime design company Wally Yachts.

Biography 
He was born on 24 November 1956 into a wealthy Milanese family. As a child he learnt to sail while staying at their house in Portofino on the Italian Riviera. Later he studied economics at Bocconi University, where he was awarded a Ph.D., before working in his father's electrical supply business.

He formed the Wally Yachts company after having directed the design of a yacht for his own use in 1991. He founded the company headquarters to Monaco in 1994.

References

Businesspeople from Milan
Italian yacht designers
Bocconi University alumni
Living people
1950s births
Farr 30 class world champions
World champions in sailing for Italy